Palgwatang is a soup boiled with turtle's head and legs. Terrapin can be used as a substitute.

It is similar to China's Palgwaetang(八卦湯). Palgwatang contains ginger, tree ear, ginkgo nut, Cordyceps militaris, ginseng, chest nut, shiitake mushroom and jujube.

Efficacy and side effect 
There are claims that the soup is effective for people who are easily tired and heavy. Supposedly people with acute illnesses such as colds should avoid this dish.

References 

Korean soups and stews